
Year 464 BC was a year of the pre-Julian Roman calendar. At the time, it was known as the Year of the Consulship of Albinus and Fusus (or, less frequently, year 290 Ab urbe condita). The denomination 464 BC for this year has been used since the early medieval period, when the Anno Domini calendar era became the prevalent method in Europe for naming years.

Events 
 By place 
 Greece 
 Sparta suffers the effects of a severe earthquake leading to a large loss of life.
 When the Messenian helots (serfs) revolt against their Spartan masters following the severe earthquake, King Archidamus II organises the defence of Sparta. The helots fortify themselves at Mount Ithome.

 Persian Empire 
 Egypt seizes the opportunity created by the murder of Xerxes I to revolt against Persia. The revolt is led by Inaros, a Libyan, who gains control of the Delta region and is aided by the Athenians.
 Artaxerxes I succeeds Xerxes as king of the Persian empire.

Births

Deaths

References